"Voices in the Sky" is a hit 1968 single by the progressive rock band the Moody Blues, and it was written by their lead guitarist Justin Hayward. It was released as a single in June 1968, with "Dr. Livingstone, I Presume" on the B-side. It was later released on their 1968 album In Search of the Lost Chord, and was the first of two singles from that album, the other being "Ride My See-Saw".

Personnel
 Justin Hayward – vocals, acoustic guitar
 John Lodge – bass guitar, backing vocals
 Mike Pinder – Mellotron, backing vocals
 Ray Thomas – flute, backing vocals
 Graeme Edge – drums, percussion, tabla

Chart positions

References

External links
  - Colour Me Pop, 1968

1968 singles
The Moody Blues songs
Songs written by Justin Hayward
Deram Records singles
1968 songs